John Alfred Ellet (June 22, 1838–April 12, 1892) was an lieutenant colonel in the United States Army during the American Civil War.

He commanded the ram  until she sank on March 23, 1863, while attempting to steam past the batteries of Vicksburg, Mississippi, at night.  He served as commanding officer of the United States Ram Fleet after his cousin Charles Rivers Ellet stepped down due to illness.

He was the son of Johan Israel and Laura (Scarlett) Ellet, nephew of Colonel Charles Ellet, Jr. and Brigadier General Alfred W. Ellet and cousin to Charles Rivers Ellet.

He died in Boulder, Colorado and was interred at Columbia Cemetery.

Namesakes
USS Ellet (DD-398), which was in service in 1939–46, was named in honor of John A. Ellet and other members of his family.

Notes

References
 
 

1838 births
1892 deaths
Burials in Colorado
People of Pennsylvania in the American Civil War
Union Navy officers
United States Ram Fleet